Carter Jonas is a limited liability partnership and firm of property consultants, chartered surveyors, chartered planners and estate agents with offices in England and Wales. They advise a broad range of individuals, companies and institutions.

The current chairman is James Bainbridge FRICS and chief executive is Mark Granger FRICS.

History
The roots of the firm go back to 1759 but it takes its name from John Carter Jonas, who established an office in Cambridge in 1855. It merged with Dreweatt Neate in 2009 and is one of the largest firms of property consultants in the UK, with 33 offices and over 800 employees.

Services
 Sales, Acquisitions and Lettings.
 Residential, Rural and Commercial services.
 Property Management and Valuation.
 Energy, Planning, Minerals and Marine.
 Architecture and Building Design.

References

External links
carterjonas.co.uk

Property services companies of the United Kingdom
Companies based in the City of Westminster
Companies established in 1855